Jorge Añon is a Uruguayan football manager.

He was appointed as head coach of the Grenada national football team in April 2015.

Añón represented Uruguay at the 1979 South American U-20 Championship which they won qualifying for the 1979 FIFA World Youth Championship.

References 

Living people
1961 births
Independiente Santa Fe footballers
Uruguayan footballers
Uruguayan football managers
Vanuatu national football team managers
Grenada national football team managers
Association footballers not categorized by position
Uruguayan expatriate football managers
Uruguayan expatriate sportspeople in Vanuatu
Expatriate football managers in Grenada
Expatriate football managers in Vanuatu